Syneta extorris is a species of leaf beetle. It is found in eastern North America.

Subspecies
These two subspecies belong to the species Syneta extorris:
 Syneta extorris borealis Brown, 1961 i c g – pale males, occurs from Newfoundland to Ontario and New York, feeds on balsam fir (Abies balsamea) and on white and red spruce (Picea glauca and Picea rubens).
 Syneta extorris extorris Brown, 1940 i c g – dark males, restricted to higher elevations in the southern Appalachian Mountains, feeds on southern fir (Abies fraseri) and red spruce (Picea rubens).
Data sources: i = ITIS, c = Catalogue of Life, g = GBIF, b = Bugguide.net

References

Further reading

 

Synetinae
Articles created by Qbugbot
Beetles described in 1940